Irina Mikhailovna Baronova FRAD (13 March 1919 – 28 June 2008) was a Russian ballerina and actress who was one of the Baby Ballerinas of the Ballet Russe de Monte Carlo, discovered by George Balanchine in Paris in the 1930s. She created roles in Léonide Massine's Le Beau Danube (1924), Jeux d'enfants (1932), and Les Présages (1933); and in Bronislava Nijinska's Les Cent Baisers (1935).

Biography

Baronova was born in Saint Petersburg (then known as Petrograd) in 1919, the daughter of a lieutenant in the Imperial Navy, Mikhail Baronov, and his wife Lidia. In November 1920, the Baronov family escaped the Russian Revolution by dressing as peasants and crossing the border into Romania. After first arriving in Arges, Romania, the family eventually settled in Bucharest. Irina's father found work at a factory and, for the next several years, the Baronov family lived in the slums surrounding the various factories where Mikhail was employed. Their start on life in Bucharest was a tumultuous one, having arrived in this foreign country without speaking the language and with no money.

Irina's mother, who loved the ballet and had often attended the theatre in St. Petersburg, found a ballet teacher in Bucharest for Irina. In 1927, at the age of seven, Irina began taking her first ballet lessons. Mme. Majaiska, who was a former corps de ballet member of the Mariinsky Theatre Ballet, and a refugee like the Baronovs, conducted these ballet lessons.

The lessons took place in Mme. Majaiska's one room home, where Irina would hold onto the kitchen table as a barre, and was accompanied by her mother's humming as music. When Irina was 10 years old, the family moved to Paris to provide her with professional training. She was taught by Olga Preobrajenska. She also studied with fellow ballerina Mathilde Kschessinska. Baronova made her debut aged 11 at the Paris Opera in 1930.

The crucial point in Baronova's career came in 1932, just a few months short of her thirteenth birthday. She, along with two other girls, Tamara Toumanova (aged 12), and Tatiana Riabouchinska (aged 14), were hired by George Balanchine to become ballerinas in the newly formed Ballets Russes de Monte-Carlo. Their extreme youth and technical perfection won them fame around the world. During their first season in London with the Ballets Russes, English critic Arnold Haskell coined the term "Baby Ballerinas" for Toumanova, Riabouchinska and Baronova.

Baronova's first principal role was Odette in Swan Lake, partnered by Anton Dolin, which she performed at just 14 years old. An animal lover, she traveled the world with her pet marmoset. On tour in Barcelona in 1937, she bought another monkey. She lived and toured with both for the next nine years.

At age 17, she eloped with an older Russian, German ("Jerry" or "Gerry") Sevastianov. Two years later, they had a church wedding in Sydney, Australia, where she was on tour. She then joined the Ballet Theatre in the USA, under the patronage of Sol Hurok, and she and Sevastianov subsequently divorced. While in Britain in 1946, she met the agent Cecil Tennant, who asked her to marry him if she would give up ballet. Aged only 27, she agreed and retired.

Between 1940 and 1951, Baronova appeared in several films, including Ealing Studios Train of Events (1949) and worked as ballet mistress for the 1980 film Nijinsky.

Baronova and Tennant had three children, Victoria, Irina and Robert. Through Victoria, she became the mother-in-law of Steve Martin. In 2014, Victoria published a pictorial biography of her mother's life entitled Irina Baronova and the Ballets Russes de Monte Carlo.

In 1967, Cecil Tennant was killed in a car accident, and Baronova moved to Switzerland. Later, she resumed her relationship with her first husband, Jerry Sevastianov, who died in 1974. She returned to teaching master classes in the United States and United Kingdom in 1976. Margot Fonteyn asked her to conduct a training course for teachers. In 1986, she staged Fokine's Les Sylphides for The Australian Ballet. In 1992, she returned to Russia to help the Mariinsky Theatre with an archival project. In 1996, she received a Vaslav Nijinsky Medal from Poland and an honorary doctorate from the North Carolina School of the Arts.

Baronova's daughter Irina moved to Byron Bay, Australia and, after visiting her in 2000, Baronova decided to settle there as well. In 2005, Baronova appeared in the documentary "Ballets Russes" and published her autobiography, Irina: Ballet, Life and Love, which she wrote out in longhand despite having lost much of her sight.

Baronova was vice president and a fellow of the Royal Academy of Dance (FRAD). She was a patron of the Australian Ballet School.

Death
Only five weeks before her death, she spoke at a symposium in Adelaide, South Australia, on the Ballets Russes' tours of Australia. She died in her sleep at Byron Bay on 28 June 2008, aged 89.

Filmography

See also
 List of Russian ballet dancers

References

Further reading
 Irina: Ballet, Life and Love Autobiography, 2005, Penguin/Viking, University Press of Florida 
 Lister, Raymond (1983) There Was a Star Danced... Linton, Cambridge (A 32-copies limited edition art work on Baronova)

External links

Obituary, The Daily Telegraph (1 July 2008)
Obituary at NEWSru (3 July 2008) 

Irina Baronova Gallery at the National Library of Australia

1919 births
2008 deaths
American ballerinas
Ballet Russe de Monte Carlo dancers
Soviet emigrants to Romania
Romanian expatriates in France
Romanian emigrants to the United States
American film actresses
American expatriates in Switzerland
American emigrants to Australia
21st-century American women
20th-century American ballet dancers